The 1968 KFK competitions in Ukraine were part of the 1968 Soviet KFK competitions that were conducted in the Soviet Union. It was 5th season of the KFK in Ukraine since its introduction in 1964.

First stage

Group 1
 GUS Horlivka
 Shakhtar Kirovsk
 Avanhard Vilnohirsk
 Mayak Kharkiv

Group 2
 Temp Kyiv
 Spartak Kirovohrad
 Vahonobudivnyk Kremenchuk
 Sumy Oblast

Group 3
 Kolhospnyk Buchach
 Avanhard Bila Tserkva
 Elektryk Lutsk
 Kolos Bar

Group 4
 Khimik Kalush
 Khimik Chernihiv
 Enerhetyk Zhytomyr
 Lokomotyv Smila

Group 5
 Tytan Zaporizhia
 Avanhard Boryslav
 Vostannie Tatarbunary
 Molot Yevpatoria
 Zenit Mykolaiv

Final
Final stage was taking place on 24 October – 1 November 1968 in cities of Kalush and Broshniv-Osada.

Promotion
None of KFK teams were promoted to the 1969 Ukrainian Class B.
 none

However, to the Class B were promoted following teams that did not participate in the KFK competitions:
 FC Budivelnyk Pervomaisk
 FC Avanhard Antratsyt

References

Ukrainian Football Amateur League seasons
4
Soviet
Soviet
football